Újpest Football Club is a professional football club based in Újpest district of Budapest, Hungary.

Managers
 Ferenc Weisz (1920–22)
 Ödön Holits (1922–24)
 György Hlavay (1924–25)
 Ödön Holits (1925–26)
 Imre Pozsonyi (1926–28)
 Lajos Bányai (1928–32)
 István Tóth Potya (1932–34)
 Béla Jánossy (1934–37)
 László Sternberg (1937–38)
 Béla Guttmann (1938–39)
 István Mészáros (1939–40)
 Géza Takács (1940–43)
 Lajos Lutz (1943)
 Géza Kertész (1943–44)
 Géza Takács (1945)
 Pál Jávor (1945–47)
 Béla Guttmann (1947)
 Jenő Vincze (1947–48)
 Károly Sós (1948)
 István Balogh I (1948–49)
 József Ember (01/07/1949–30/06/1950)
 Tibor Kemény (1949–50)
 Zoltán Opata (1950–51)
 Pál Jávor (1951–54)
 Gyula Kolozsvári (1954)
 Márton Bukovi (1955–56)
 Sándor Balogh II (1957–58)
 István Balogh I (1958–59)
 Gyula Szűcs (Jan 1, 1959 – Dec 31, 1960)
 László Fenyvesi (1960–61)
 Géza Kalocsay (01/07/1961-30/06/1962)
 Gyula Szűcs (01/07/1962-31/12/1963)
 Ferenc Szusza (1963–65)
 Sándor Balogh II (1965–66)
 Lajos Baróti (1967–71)
 Imre Kovács (1971–73)
 Gyula Szűcs (01/01/1973-31/12/1973)
 Pál Várhidi (01/01/1974-30/06/1980)
 Ferenc Szusza (1980–81)
 Miklós Temesvári (1981–85)
 János Göröcs (1985–88)
 István Varga (1988–90)
 Ferenc Kovács (01/07/1990–30/06/1992)
 Ferenc Bene (1992–93)
 József Garami (01/07/1993–30/06/1996)
 László Nagy (1996–97)
 Péter Várhidi (1997–99)
 Róbert Glázer (1999)
 Péter Várhidi (2000)
 István Kisteleki (2000–01)
 Róbert Glázer (Dec 16, 2001 – June 13, 2002)
 László Molnár (2002)
 András Szabó (2002–03)
 András Sarlós (2003)
 György Mezey (June 5, 2003 – Feb 17, 2004)
 Géza Mészöly (July 1, 2004 – June 30, 2006)
 Bertalan Bicskei (2006)
 Valère Billen (July 14, 2006 – Dec 22, 2006)
 István Urbányi (Dec 12, 2006 – April 22, 2008)
 Lázár Szentes (April 22, 2008 – May 28, 2009)
 Willie McStay (01/07/2009-04/04/2010)
 Géza Mészöly (04/04/2010-10/08/2011)
 Zoran Spisljak (10/08/2011-11/04/2012)
 Marc Lelièvre (interim) (11/04/2012-01/06/2012)
 Jos Daerden (01.07.2012-05.03.2013)
 Marc Lelièvre (interim) (05.03.2013-03.06.2013)
 István Kozma (03.06.2013-23.10.2013)
 Nebojša Vignjević (Oct 23, 2013–01.06.2020)
 Predrag Rogan (01.06.2020-present)
 Michael Oenning (23 December 2020-31 December 2021)
 Miloš Kruščić (13 January 2022-present)

References

External links

 
Ujpest